Bosomtwe is one of the constituencies represented in the Parliament of Ghana. It elects one Member of Parliament (MP) by the first past the post system of election. It is located in the Botsomtwe District of the Ashanti Region of Ghana.

Boundaries
Bosomtwe is located in the Botsomtwe District of the Ashanti Region of Ghana.

Members of Parliament

Elections

See also
List of Ghana Parliament constituencies

References 

Parliamentary constituencies in the Ashanti Region